El Valle de Antón, generally called El Valle, or Anton's Valley in English, is a town of 7,600 in the Coclé province of Panama.

Geography

The town is located in the flat wide caldera of the 6 km wide El Valle volcano that is inactive; there is evidence that it erupted as recently as about 300,000 years ago  Because of its elevation (600 m), it is cooler than the Panamanian lowlands. Natural attractions near El Valle include the Chorro El Macho waterfall, Las Mozas waterfall, the "square" trees behind Hotel Campestre, and a group of small thermal pools (which consist of three cement pools of mineralized water that varies in color depending on the specific minerals present at a given moment). The area around the town is also known for being one of the last habitats of the critically endangered Panamanian golden frog. Some of the forests around the town are protected areas.

Demographics
El Valle had a population of 7,602 as of 2010. Its population as of 1990 was 4,900; its population as of 2000 was 6,175.

Features

El Valle has one main road, called Avenida Central or Calle Central, which runs east–west across the town. A main landmark is the town's public market, which is open seven days a week, although it is sometimes referred to as El Valle's Sunday Market. El Valle has a very small historical and geological museum, as well as a small zoo (El Nispero, named after a type of tree), a small serpentarium, a butterfly house, and an orchid conservation center, called APROVACA, which displays over 100 native local orchid species. There are also several petroglyphs west of town that are known as La Piedra Pintada.

Some of the people who own properties in the heart of El Valle are wealthy people from Panama City who use the area as their vacation or weekend home. Popular activities in the area include cycling, hiking, horseback riding, and birdwatching. El Valle is home to around 500 species of birds.

The town is about 25 km off the Interamerican Highway by a two-lane road. The road is generally in good condition, with a few potholes that are repaired regularly. Buses, usually mini-buses, to Panama City are frequent and take approximately 2.5 hours.  As of 2014, the last direct bus to Panama City leaves El Valle at 3pm with a fare of $4.25. To reach other locations in Panama, it is generally necessary to take a bus to San Carlos and transfer there. As of 2014, the last bus from El Valle to San Carlos leaves at 6pm.

Sources

Notes

Works cited
Friar, William. Panama. Moon Publications (2008). .
Reid, Robert et al. Central America on a shoestring. Lonely Planet (2007). .

Further reading
 APROVACA

External links

 Official Website of Anton's Valley Chamber of Tourism
 Official Website of El Valle 
 Website of El Valle de Anton
 Travelogue on El Valle

Populated places in Coclé Province
Corregimientos of Coclé Province